Frederick Lansing (February 16, 1838 – January 31, 1894) was a U.S. Representative from New York.

Biography
Born in Manheim, New York, Lansing attended the Little Falls Academy, New York.
He studied law.
He was admitted to the bar in 1859, and practiced in Watertown, New York.
He served during the Civil War in the Eighth New York Cavalry; was acting adjutant of that regiment from June 23 to October 11, 1863.
He was a member of the New York State Senate (21st D.) from 1882 to 1885, sitting in the 105th, 106th, 107th and 108th New York State Legislatures.

Lansing was elected as a Republican to the 51st United States Congress, holding office from March 4, 1889, to March 3, 1891.

He died on January 31, 1894, in Watertown, New York, and was interred in Brookside Cemetery.

Sources

1838 births
1894 deaths
Union Army officers
Republican Party New York (state) state senators
Republican Party members of the United States House of Representatives from New York (state)
19th-century American politicians
Lansing family